David, Dave, Davey, or Davie Shaw may refer to:

Sportsmen
Davie Shaw (1917–1977), Scottish footballer for Scotland national football team and Hibernian F.C.
David Shaw (Australian footballer) (born 1938), Essendon premiership player and club president
David Shaw (footballer, born 1948), English striker
David Shaw (Canadian football) (born 1953), defensive back
David Shaw (ice hockey) (born 1964), Canadian defenceman
David Shaw (cricketer) (born 1967), English right-handed batsman and medium pace bowler
David Shaw (American football) (born 1972), wide receiver and former Stanford Cardinal head coach
Davey Shaw, American motorcycle racer at 2013 AMA National Speedway Championship

Others
David Shaw (minister) (1719–1810), Scottish minister
David Shaw (writer) (1943–2005), American journalist for Los Angeles Times
David Shaw (British politician) (1950–2022), British Conservative MP for Dover
David E. Shaw (born 1951), American entrepreneur and scientist; founder of D. E. Shaw & Co.
David Shaw (painter) (1952–1989), English print-maker, lecturer and drawing tutor
Dave Shaw (1954–2005), Australian scuba diver
David Shaw (British Army officer) (born 1957), British general
Dave Shaw, host of 2002 Canadian TV series Condensed Classics with Dave Shaw
David Shaw, American frontman since 2007 for rock band The Revivalists

See also
The Runaway Summer of Davie Shaw